Ridin' Down the Trail is a 1947 American Western film directed by Howard Bretherton and written by Bennett Cohen. The film stars Jimmy Wakely, Dub Taylor, Douglas Fowley, John James, Douglas Aylesworth and Beverly Jons. The film was released on October 4, 1947, by Monogram Pictures.

Plot

Cast              
Jimmy Wakely as Jimmy Wakely
Dub Taylor as Cannonball 
Douglas Fowley as Mark Butler
John James as Dakota 
Douglas Aylesworth as Ed Lancer 
Beverly Jons as Mary Bradon
Charles King as Brown 
Buster Slaven as Silton 
Kermit Maynard as Allen
Harry Carr as Tom Bradon
Milburn Morante as Doc Jackson
Ted French as Mason
Post Park as Jeb 
Dick Reinhart as Shorty 
Don Weston as Jack 
Jesse Ashlock as Dick 
Stanley Ellison as Pete 
Wayne Burson as Spike

References

External links
 

1947 films
American Western (genre) films
1947 Western (genre) films
Monogram Pictures films
Films directed by Howard Bretherton
American black-and-white films
1940s English-language films
1940s American films